The following are the association football events of the year 1995 throughout the world.

Events
Copa Libertadores 1995: Won by Grêmio after defeating Atlético Nacional on an aggregate score of 4–2.
January 18 – Guus Hiddink makes his debut as the manager of Netherlands national team with a friendly loss (0–1) against France. Two players make their debut as well: strikers Michael Mols (FC Twente) and Glenn Helder (Vitesse Arnhem).
January 19 – Dutch club FC Zwolle names former goalkeeper Piet Schrijvers as their new manager to replace Ben Hendriks.
January 25 – Eric Cantona, in an away match against Crystal Palace, he launched a 'kung-fu' style kick against an abusive Crystal Palace fan, Matthew Simmons, after being sent off by the referee for a tackle on Palace defender Richard Shaw. He then got up from his seat and left, leaving many of the assembled crowd bemused. One month later, he was sentenced to 120 hours of community service after an appeal court overturned a 2-week prison sentence for assault. He was also suspended by The Football Association until the following October.
February 15 – English soccer hooligans, led by members of Combat 18, riot at Lansdowne Road during a friendly between the Republic of Ireland and England. The match, refereed by Dutchman Dick Jol, is abandoned.
February 22 – Guus Hiddink loses his first match as the new head coach of the Netherlands national team; Portugal defeats the Netherlands in Eindhoven through a goal by Pedro Barbosa.
March 29 – Bryan Roy plays his last international match for the Netherlands national team, earning his 32nd cap against Malta.
May 20 – Everton claims the English FA Cup with a 1–0 win over Manchester United.
May 24 – UEFA Champions League won by Ajax Amsterdam after defeating A.C. Milan in the Ernst Happel Stadium through a goal from Patrick Kluivert.
June 7 – John van 't Schip plays his last international match for the Netherlands national team, earning his 41st cap against Belarus, while goalkeeper Edwin van der Sar makes his debut in the Euro 1996 qualifying match in Minsk.
June 18 – In 2nd edition of FIFA Women's World Cup, Norway wins 2–0 over Germany
August 16 – Ajax Amsterdam once again claims the Dutch Super Cup, the annual opening of the new season in the Eredivisie, this time by a 2–1 win in extra-time over Feyenoord Rotterdam.
October 2 – Feyenoord Rotterdam fires manager Willem van Hanegem and names Arie Haan as his successor.
November 20 – Manager Ronald Spelbos is fired by Dutch club Vitesse Arnhem and replaced by Frans Thijssen.
November 28 – Ajax Amsterdam wins the Intercontinental Cup in Tokyo, Japan by defeating Brazil's Grêmio after penalties: 4–3. The decisive penalty is scored by skipper Danny Blind.
December 8 – Dutch club NEC Nijmegen fires Cees van Kooten and appoints Wim Koevermans.
December 12 – The Lebanese national team beat Slovakia national football team 2 – 1 in a friendly match in Beirut.
December 13 – The Netherlands national team qualifies for Euro 1996 by defeating the Republic of Ireland (2–0) in a play-off at Anfield Road, Liverpool. Both goals are scored by Patrick Kluivert.
December 15 – The European Court of Justice makes the Bosman ruling, which means all footballers not under contract are free to move clubs without any economic compensation to their former club. A secondary result of the ruling means the abolition of the foreign player quotas, at least as they affect nationals of European Union member states.
December 15 – Korean club Suwon Samsung Bluewings is officially founded.

Winner club national championships

Asia
  Japan – Yokohama F. Marinos
  Qatar – Al-Rayyan SC
  South Korea – Ilhwa Chunma

Europe
  – Hajduk Split
  – Blackburn Rovers
  - Haka Valkeakoski
  – FC Nantes
  – Borussia Dortmund
  – Juventus
  – Netherlands
 Eredivisie – Ajax Amsterdam
 Eerste Divisie – Fortuna Sittard
  – FC Porto
  – Real Madrid
  – Beşiktaş
  – Dynamo Kyiv
  – Red Star Belgrade

North America
 – Necaxa
 /  – Seattle Sounders (APSL)

South America
 Argentina
Clausura – San Lorenzo
Apertura – Vélez Sársfield
 Bolivia – San José
 Brazil – Botafogo
 Chile – Universidad de Chile
 Paraguay – Olimpia Asunción
 – Sporting Cristal

International tournaments
 FIFA Women's World Cup in Sweden
 
 
 
 Baltic Cup in Riga, Latvia
 
 
 
 Canada Cup in Edmonton, Canada
 
 
 
 Copa América in Uruguay
 
 
 
 Pan American Games in Mar del Plata, Argentina
 
 
 
 FIFA U-20 World Cup in Qatar
 
 
 
 FIFA U-17 World Championship in Ecuador
 
 
 
 UNCAF Nations Cup in San Salvador, El Salvador

National team results

Europe



Births

 3 January: Muhammed Demirci, Turkish footballer
 4 January: 
Muhammad Tahir, Indonesian footballer
Adam Webster, English footballer
 15 January: Sinan Bytyqi, Albanian professional footballer
 20 January: Sergi Samper, Spanish footballer 
 30 January: Marcos Llorente, Spanish footballer
 7 February: Shani Tarashaj, Swiss footballer 
 8 February: 
 Joshua Kimmich, German footballer
 Zakarie Labidi, French footballer
 14 February: Diego Fagúndez, Uruguayan footballer
 18 February: Nathan Aké, Dutch footballer
 25 March: Nataniel de Jesus Reis, East Timorese international footballer
 6 March: Utam Rusdiana, Indonesian footballer
 13 March: Evan Dimas, Indonesian footballer
 13 March: Héctor Bellerín, Spanish international
 1 June: Carlos Castro García, Spanish footballer
 23 June: Kristopher Vida, Hungarian footballer
 25 June: Andriy Markovych, Ukrainian footballer
 1 July
 James Hamon, Guernsey-born footballer
 Ryuji Utomo, Indonesian footballer
 2 July: James Davis Borikó, Equatoguinean international footballer
 5 July: Baily Cargill, English footballer
 6 July:
 Robert Obst, Polish footballer
 Mario López Quintana, Paraguayan footballer
 11 July:
 Vitali Lystsov, Russian youth international
 Nikita Khaykin, Israeli youth international
 12 July: Bernard Donovan, Zimbabwean international footballer
 18 September: 
 Max Meyer, German footballer
 Matt Targett, English footballer
 3 October: Simonas Stankevičius, Lithuanian international footballer
 9 October: Kenny Tete, Dutch International footballer
 20 November: Théo Bongonda, Belgian youth international 
 7 December: Santi Mina, Spanish footballer
 8 December: Jordon Ibe, English footballer

Deaths

February
 February 23 – Sergio Bertoni, Italian striker, winner of the 1938 FIFA World Cup. (79)

March
 March 20 - Werner Liebrich, German international footballer (born 1927)

April
 April 22 – Carlo Ceresoli, Italian goalkeeper, winner of the 1938 FIFA World Cup. (84)

May
 May 6 – Noel Brotherston (38), Northern Irish footballer
 May 30 – Ted Drake (83), English footballer
 May 30 – Bobby Stokes (44), English footballer

September
 September 15 – Gunnar Nordahl (74), Swedish international footballer
 September 15 – Dirceu, Brazilian midfielder, included in the World Cup All-Star Team at the 1978 FIFA World Cup . (43 ; car crash)
 September 28 – Albert Johanneson (55), South African footballer

October
 October 7 – Emanuele Del Vecchio, Brazilian forward, Brazilian squad member at the 1956 South American Championship. (61)

December
 December 24 – Carlos Lapetra (57), Spanish footballer

Movies
The Big Green (USA)

References

 
Association football by year